Medi-Caps is a private university in the state of Madhya Pradesh in India, founded in 2000. It offers engineering and management degrees.

Courses 
The university offers engineering, management degrees and general commerce degrees.

UGC & AICTE status 
The university is a private university approved by the UGC.

Its engineering courses are approved by AICTE.

Ranking 
The university has been ranked as the 106th best university by the Outlook magazine while the India Today ranked it at 137 in the year 2020.

Departments

Undergraduate studies
The university offers engineering degrees in the following branches:
Automobile Engineering
Civil Engineering
Computer Science and Engineering
Electrical and Electronics Engineering 
Electronics and Communication Engineering 
Electronics and Instrumentation Engineering 
Information Technology 
Mechanical Engineering 
Electrical Engineering
Fire Technology and Safety Engineering

Other undergraduate degrees:

 BBA
 BCOM
 BSC
 BCA

Computer Science, Electronics and Communication, and Mechanical departments are accredited by the National Board of Accreditation (NBA).

Postgraduate studies
MU offers postgraduate degrees in:

Master of Business Administration (MBA)
Master of Computer Application (MCA)
Master of Engineering (MTech/ME); Computer Science
Master of Engineering (MTech/ME); Electronics and Communication Engineering (Digital Electronics)
Master of Engineering (MTech/ME); Information Technology
Master of Engineering (MTech/ME); Mechanical Engineering (Computer Integrated Manufacturing)
Master of Engineering (MTech/ME); Nano Technology

Annual events
 Nexus workshop: national-level robotics competition held in association with IIT Bombay. 
 Moonstone: cultural fest
 National Conference on Emerging Trends in Computing and Communication [ETCC-2010].
 HACKTRACK: Workshop on Ethical Hacking and Information Security in association with IIT Bombay and Techdefence Ltd.

See also
Indore University (governing/parent university)
Rajiv Gandhi Technical University

References

External links 
 Official website

Universities and colleges in Indore
Engineering colleges in Madhya Pradesh
Science and technology in Indore
Educational institutions established in 2000
2000 establishments in Madhya Pradesh